Spruce bark beetle is a common name for several insects and may refer to:

Dendroctonus micans, the great spruce bark beetle
Ips typographus, the European spruce bark beetle

See also
Spruce beetle

Insect common names